My Jesus may refer to:

My Jesus (album), a 2022 studio album by Anne Wilson
"My Jesus" (song), a 2021 song by Anne Wilson, title track of the album
My Jesus (Live in Nashville), a 2021 EP by Anne Wilson
"My Jesus", a song by Leeland from Love Is on the Move
"My Jesus", a song by Todd Agnew from Reflection of Something